Lieutenant General Stuart Richard Skeates,  (born 1966) is a British Army officer. He served as Deputy Commander of JFC Brunssum from December 2018 to December 2021. He also previously served as Standing Joint Force Commander from 2015 to 2018.

Early life and education
Skeates was born in 1966. He was educated at The Judd School in Tonbridge, King's College London (BA History, 1988; MA Defence Studies, 1999) and the Royal Military Academy Sandhurst.

Military career
Skeates was commissioned into the Royal Artillery in 1989. He served in the Gulf War and in the Bosnian War, took part in the invasion of Iraq in 2003 and then served as Military Assistant to the General Officer Commanding Northern Ireland in the final years of Operation Banner. He became Commanding Officer of 26th Regiment Royal Artillery in Gütersloh, then Deputy Commander of 52nd Brigade (deployed as Task Force Helmand) and then Deputy Assistant Chief of Staff Operations at Permanent Joint Headquarters. He became Commander of 19th Light Brigade in December 2009, and Deputy Commander of I Marine Expeditionary Force (Forward) in 2011.

Skeates was appointed Commandant of the Royal Military Academy Sandhurst in August 2013. He was appointed as Standing Joint Force Commander on 24 June 2015. He was promoted to lieutenant general and appointed as Deputy Commander JFC Brunssum from 4 December 2018. Since 12 October 2022, he has been on secondment to the Home Office: he is tasked with commanding the refugee processing centre at RAF Manston and dealing with the increased English Channel migrant crossings.

Skeates was appointed Companion of the Order of the Bath (CB) in the 2022 New Year Honours.

References

1966 births
Living people
Alumni of King's College London
Alumni of Cranfield University
British Army generals
British Army personnel of the Iraq War
British Army personnel of the War in Afghanistan (2001–2021)
Companions of the Order of the Bath
Commanders of the Order of the British Empire
People educated at The Judd School
Royal Artillery officers